Leptophis mexicanus, commonly known as the Mexican parrot snake, is a species of medium-sized slender snake in the family Colubridae. The species is endemic to the Americas.

Geographic range
L. mexicanus can be found in southern Mexico and Central America, in Guatemala, Belize, Honduras, El Salvador, Nicaragua, and Costa Rica.

Subspecies
There are four recognized subspecies, including the nominate subspecies.
L. m. hoeversi Henderson, 1976
L. m. mexicanus A.M.C. Duméril, Bibron & A.H.A. Duméril, 1854
L. m. septentrionalis Mertens, 1972
L. m. yucatanensis Oliver, 1942

References

Further reading
Duméril A-M-C, Bibron G, Dumeril A[-H-A] (1854). Erpétologie générale ou histoire naturelle complète des reptiles, Tome septième. Première partie. Comprenant l'histoire des serpents non venimeux. Paris: Roret. xvi + 780 pp. (Leptophis mexicanus, new species, pp. 536–537). (in French).
Henderson RW (1976). "A New Insular Subspecies of the Colubrid Snake Leptophis mexicanus (Reptilia, Serpentes, Colubridae) from Belize". J. Herpetology 10 (4): 329–331. (Leptophis mexicanus hoeversi, new subspecies).
Liner, Ernest A. (2007). "A Checklist of the Amphibians and Reptiles of Mexico". Louisiana State University Occasional Papers of the Museum of Natural Science 80: 1-60.
Mertens R (1972). "Eine neue Schlankatter der Gattung Leptophis aus Mexico ". Senckenbergiana Biologica 53 (5-6): 341–342. (Leptophis mexicanus septentrionalis, new subspecies). (in German).
Oliver JA (1942). "A check list of the snakes of the genus Leptophis, with descriptions of new forms". Occ. Pap. Mus. Zool. Univ. Michigan (462): 1–19. (Leptophis mexicanus yucatanensis, new subspecies, p. 10).

Colubrids
Snakes of Central America
Reptiles of Belize
Reptiles of Costa Rica
Reptiles of El Salvador
Reptiles of Guatemala
Reptiles of Honduras
Reptiles of Mexico
Reptiles of Nicaragua
Taxa named by Gabriel Bibron
Taxa named by André Marie Constant Duméril
Taxa named by Auguste Duméril
Reptiles described in 1854